Claudia Michelsen (born 4 February 1969) is a German actress. She has appeared in more than eighty films since 1989.

Selected filmography

External links

 

1969 births
Living people
Actors from Dresden
German film actresses
German television actresses
20th-century German actresses
21st-century German actresses